A national hero of the Philippines is a Filipino who has been recognized as a national hero for their role in the history of the Philippines. Loosely, the term may refer to all Filipino historical figures recognized as heroes, but the term more strictly refers to those officially designated as such. In 1995 the Philippine National Heroes Committee officially recommended several people for the designation, but this was not acted upon. , no one had ever been officially recognized as a Philippine national hero.

The reformist writer Jose Rizal, today generally considered the greatest Filipino hero and often given as the Philippine national hero, has never been explicitly proclaimed as the (or even a) national hero by the Philippine government.  Besides Rizal, the only other Filipino currently given implied recognition as a national hero is Andrés Bonifacio, based on the Philippine government's policy on national holidays. While other historical figures are commemorated in public municipal or provincial holidays. Only Rizal and Andrés Bonifacio to date are commemorated in full or "regular" national holidays-  the only ones, based on this metric. The National Heroes Committee recommended Jose Rizal, Andres Bonifacio, Emilio Aguinaldo, Apolinario Mabini, Marcelo H. del Pilar, Sultan Dipatuan Kudarat, Juan Luna, Melchora Aquino, and Gabriela Silang  to be recognized as national heroes on November 15, 1995. No action was taken on the recommendation.

Qualifications
According to the 1993 Technical Committee, the National Hero shall be:
Those who have a concept of nation and thereafter aspire and struggle for the nation's freedom.
Those who define and contribute to a system or life of freedom and order for a nation. Heroes are those who make the nation's constitution and laws.
Heroes are those who contribute to the quality of life and destiny of a nation.
Three more criteria were added in 1995:
A hero is part of the people's expression. But the process of a people's internalization of a hero's life and works takes time, with the youth forming a part of the internalization.
A hero thinks of the future, especially the future generations.
The choice of a hero involves not only the recounting of an episode or events in history, but of the entire process that made this particular person a hero.

History

1890s
Already admired in his lifetime for his nationalistic writings and activities, Jose Rizal was executed for treason on December 30, 1896, by the Spanish colonial government. His writings had helped inspire the Philippine Revolution against colonial rule. On December 20, 1898, Emilio Aguinaldo, President of the Philippine government, decreed December 30 of every year a day of national mourning in honor of Rizal and other victims of the revolution. Henceforth, December 30 has been celebrated as Rizal Day.

1900s
By the start of the 20th century, the Philippines had become a  territory of the United States. Rizal was given special attention as a hero by the American colonial administration because, unlike more radical figures whose ideas could inspire resistance against American rule, he was interpreted to represent peaceful political advocacy. Rizal was selected over the revolutionaries Andres Bonifacio, who was viewed as too radical, and Apolinario Mabini, who was considered unregenerate. In June 1901, Act No. 137 of the Taft Commission reorganized the district of Morong into the Province of Rizal.

1910s
On February 23, 1918, the Philippine Legislature issued Act No. 2760 which promoted the creation, maintenance, and improvement of national monuments, particularly the creation of a monument in memory of Andres Bonifacio, leader of the Katipunan secret society which spearheaded the Philippine Revolution.

1920s
On February 16, 1921, the Philippine Legislature enacted Act No. 2946, which made November 30 of each year a legal holiday to commemorate the birth of Andres Bonifacio, henceforth called Bonifacio Day.

1930s
On October 28, 1931, the Philippine Legislature enacted Act No. 3827, declaring the last Sunday of August of every year as National Heroes Day.

1960s
By 1960, Rizal was already held in such esteem that he was referred to as the Philippine national hero, even though no legislation had been passed making it official. That year, historian Teodoro Agoncillo wrote in his History of the Filipino People that the Philippine national hero, unlike those of other countries, was not "the leader of its liberation forces". Agoncillo noted the sentiments of certain quarters calling for Rizal's replacement as the national hero by Andres Bonifacio, since Rizal was interpreted as ultimately a reformist content to be under Spain, not a revolutionary wishing for independence. A distant relative of Emilio Aguinaldo who took over the reins of revolutionary power from Bonifacio and ordered the "execution" of the former, Agoncillo opined that Bonifacio should not replace Rizal as the national hero but be honored alongside him.

1970s
Historian Renato Constantino, building upon sentiments noted by Agoncillo, wrote in his 1970 essay Veneration Without Understanding that Rizal was unworthy of his high status since he was a "United States-sponsored hero".

1990s
In 1990, historian Ambeth Ocampo stated that Rizal was a "conscious hero", i.e., he had projected himself as a national figure prior to his execution and he was deemed as the national hero by Bonifacio, who even named Rizal as the honorary president of the Katipunan, long before Rizal was given reverence by the American colonial administrators.

President Fidel V. Ramos formed the National Heroes Committee on March 28, 1993, under Executive Order No. 75, titled "Creating the National Heroes Committee Under the Office of the President". The National Heroes Committee was tasked to study, evaluate and recommend Filipino national heroes to recognize their heroic character and remarkable achievements for the country.

On November 30, 1994 (Bonifacio Day), President Ramos issued Proclamation No. 510 which declared the year 1996 (the centennial of the Philippine Revolution) as the Year of Filipino Heroes.

The National Heroes Committee recommended the following nine individuals to be recognized as national heroes on November 15, 1995:

 Jose Rizal
 Andres Bonifacio
 Emilio Aguinaldo
 Apolinario Mabini
 Marcelo H. del Pilar
 Muhammad Dipatuan Kudarat
 Juan Luna
 Melchora Aquino
 Gabriela Silang

Their report was submitted to the Department of Education, Culture and Sports on November 22 of that year. However, no action was taken afterwards. It was speculated that any action might cause a number of requests for proclamation or trigger debates that revolve around the controversies about the concerned historical figures.

2000s
On July 24, 2007, President Gloria Macapagal Arroyo approved Republic Act No. 9256, which declared the Monday nearest August 21 a nationwide special holiday in honor of Senator Benigno Aquino Jr., called Ninoy Aquino Day. August 21 is Aquino's death anniversary. On the same date President Macapagal-Arroyo also approved Republic Act No. 9492, which decreed that National Heroes Day be celebrated on the last Monday of August, Bonifacio Day on the Monday nearest November 30, and Rizal Day on the Monday nearest December 30.

Following the death of President Corazon "Cory" Aquino on August 1, 2009, two resolutions, House Joint Resolution Nos. 41 and 42, have been filed proposing her official recognition as a national hero with her birthdate January 25 as Cory Aquino Day.

Gallery
Some of the persons selected for recommendation as national heroes:

See also
 Public holidays in the Philippines

References

External links
 5
 Jose Rizal's Life

National Hero
Heroes